Morse code mnemonics are systems to represent the sound of Morse characters in a way intended to be easy to remember.  Since every one of these mnemonics requires a two-step mental translation between sound and character, none of these systems are useful for using manual Morse at practical speeds. Amateur radio clubs can provide resources to learn Morse code.

Cross-linguistic

Visual mnemonic 

Visual mnemonic charts have been devised over the ages.  Baden-Powell included one in the Girl Guides handbook in 1918.

Here is a more up-to-date version, ca. 1988:

Other visual mnemonic systems have been created for Morse code, mapping the elements of the Morse code characters onto pictures for easy memorization. For instance, "R" might be represented as a "racecar" seen in a profile view, with the two wheels of the racecar being the dits and the body being the dah.

English

Syllabic mnemonics
Syllabic mnemonics are based on the principle of associating a word or phrase to each Morse code letter, with stressed syllables standing for a dah and unstressed ones for a dit.  There is no well-known complete set of syllabic mnemonics for English, but various mnemonics do exist for individual letters.

Slavic languages
In Czech, the mnemonic device to remember Morse codes lies in remembering words that begin with each appropriate letter and has so called long vowel (i.e. á é í ó ú ý) for every dash and short vowel (a e i o u y) for every dot.  Additionally, some other theme-related sets of words have been thought out as Czech folklore.

In Polish, which does not distinguish long and short vowels, Morse mnemonics are also words or short phrases that begin with each appropriate letter, but dash is coded as a syllable containing an "o" (or "ó"), while a syllable containing another vowel codes for dot. For some letters, multiple mnemonics are in use; the table shows one example.

Hebrew
Invented in 1922 by Zalman Cohen, a communication soldier in the Haganah organization.

Indonesia 

In Indonesia, one mnemonic commonly taught in scouting method to remember Morse codes lies in remembering words that begin with each appropriate letter and substituting the o vowel for every dash and other vowels (a, i, u, and e) for every dot.

References

Morse code